Ahmed Al-Suhail  (born 31 October 1988) is a Saudi football player who plays as a midfielder.

References

 

1988 births
Living people
Saudi Arabian footballers
Ettifaq FC players
Najran SC players
Al-Suqoor FC players
Al-Najma SC players
Al-Taawoun FC players
Al-Nojoom FC players
Al-Fayha FC players
Al-Ain FC (Saudi Arabia) players
Place of birth missing (living people)
Saudi First Division League players
Saudi Professional League players
Saudi Second Division players
Association football midfielders